Frank Zoko Ble or Zoko Blé Franck (born 1975) is an ex-karateka of Ivorian-Finnish nationality. During his career he represented both the Ivory Coast and Finland at a national team level. After his sports career Zoko Ble worked as an electrical engineer in Espoo, and was also a visiting researcher and doctoral student of the Aalto University.

In July 2016, the District Court of Espoo sentenced Zoko Ble to life imprisonment for the murder of his 35-year-old Ivorian wife, whom he stabbed to death with a knife in May 2015 in their joint apartment in Mankkaa. The motive for the act was jealousy and the odd thoughts of the wife's discriminating temperament. The couple's two-year-old daughter was also present at the murder, but was unharmed. Zoko Ble also has children from an earlier marriage to a Finn.

Achievements 

 Finland Cup Finals 2007.
 Finland's International Open Silver 2007.
 Finnish Championship Semi-Finals 2008.
 Budo Cup Quarterfinals 2008.

References 

Finnish prisoners sentenced to life imprisonment
Finnish male karateka
Finnish people convicted of murder
1975 births
Living people
Finnish people of Ivorian descent
Ivorian expatriate sportspeople in Finland
Ivorian male martial artists
Naturalized citizens of Finland